Mahmoud Said Salim El-Sayed nicknamed James (born 1947) is a Sudanese footballer who played as a defender. He competed in the men's tournament at the 1972 Summer Olympics. Mahmoud Said Salim was nicknamed James by his sister because he was a fan of cinema, especially James Bond.

References

External links
Sudan NT players in 1970 - 11v11.com
1972 OG football tournament - todor66.com

1947 births
Living people
Sudanese footballers
Sudan international footballers
Olympic footballers of Sudan
Footballers at the 1972 Summer Olympics
1970 African Cup of Nations players
1972 African Cup of Nations players
Africa Cup of Nations-winning players
People from Khartoum North
Association football defenders